State Route 301 (SR 301) is a  long north–south state highway in the northern portion of the U.S. state of Ohio. Its northern terminus is at U.S. Route 6 (US 6) in Sheffield Lake.

Route description
SR 301 travels through northwestern Wayne County, western Medina County and central Lorain County. No segment of this route is included as a part of the National Highway System (NHS).  The NHS is a network of highways defined as being most important for the economy, mobility and defense of the nation.

History
The SR 301 designation was applied in 1932.  Originally, the highway was routed along a short portion of its present alignment, running from US 42 in West Salem,  to its junction with US 224, then known as SR 17.

Major intersections

References

301
Transportation in Wayne County, Ohio
Transportation in Medina County, Ohio
Transportation in Lorain County, Ohio